Jonas Alfred Lipman (25 April 1877 – 18 March 1958), frequently referred to as "Joe", was an Australian philanthropist, actor, producer and director of theatre and film. He was described as "a colourful extrovert" with "a flair for the wheeling and dealing of the film trade".

History
Lipman was born in South Australia, the son of Judah Moss Lipman (c. 1852 – 7 July 1911) married Sylvia Selina Hyams (died 24 August 1918) on 9 March 1881. He was educated at Prince Alfred College.
As a young man, Lipman was active in Jewish artistic circles, performing in and directing plays.
He left Adelaide in March or April 1903 for Western Australia, initially for a matter of months, then more permanently, to manage his father's business interests in Coolgardie. In that prosperous gold-mining town Lipman was active in theatre, partly in connection with the local branch of the Australian Natives' Association.
His father was the most prominent businessman in the town, and perhaps the wealthiest; Judah Lipman ( – 7 July 1911), owner of the Cremorne, the Grand Hotel, the Brewery and much else beside. Judah's youngest brother Abraham, also known as Alfred, managed the Halfway House, then the Grand Hotel for brother Judah, died of pneumonia at Coolgardie in 1897. Judah was a son of Jonas Lipman (c. 1835 – 21 January 1880) and Hannah Lipman of Port Adelaide.
Lipman left Western Australia in July 1905, announcing his intention of joining a troupe touring India.

By 1909, he had returned to Adelaide, where he was involved as actor and director with an amateur theatre group, The Actors' Club. A noted performance was One Summers Day (Henry V. Esmond) held at the Unley Town Hall in July 1910 in aid of the St Paul's choir fund. This was followed in September by The Dilemma at the same venue. Following these two successes, The Players staged Charley's Aunt over two nights at the Theatre Royal in December and revived in June 1911 at the Unley Town Hall. In each of these Lipman was both stage director and leading man to packed houses and critical acclaim.

By 1914, he had moved to Victoria, working as stage manager and director for the Comedy Theatre at the refurbished Daylight Pictures Co. building on the Lower Esplanade, St Kilda, adjacent the Palais de Danse. The first productions, changed weekly, were: The New Baby (Arthur Bourchier); Our Girls (H. J. Byron) and The Three Hats (aka Three Hats Slightly Mixed and similar), an adaptation of a farce by Alfred Hennequin. The Comedy Theatre, a summer favorite, did not survive beyond March 1915. In 1916 and 1917 Lipman made several buying trips to the United States, and reported on the rise of Broadway.

He wrote Just Peggy while in the USA. signed the lead actress, Sara Allgood, having seen her perform on stage in J. Hartley Manners' comedy Peg o' My Heart, and filmed it in Sydney.
His best known film is probably Mystery Island (1937).

Some of his stage and film work is credited to his pseudonym, Rigby C. Tearle.

Lipman was head of several Australian motion picture distribution and exhibition companies, particularly of British films, from the late 1910s to the early 1930s. In 1918, as head of Quality Features he picked up a film  Damaged Goods on the theme of venereal disease.
In 1920, when it was playing at the Princess Theatre, Melbourne, he was fined for showing the movie, judged as obscene. The same year he helped established the company United Shows Inc. Three years later he helped set up the Australian Releasing Corporation. and Australasian Films Ltd. He also represented British International Pictures Ltd from around 1929. 
Lipman managed to achieve a great deal of success in his lifetime through his many business and personal affiliations- at one point he was reported to have purchased the rights to Charlie Chaplin for £1,000,000. His close friend and mentor was Harry Warner, of Warner Bros fame.

Personal life
He married Gertrude Solomon in 1917. 'Gertie', as she was known, was a part of the powerful Australian political dynasty the Solomon Family.

Gertrude and Joe had two children, Robert Alfred and Judith Sylvia.

He died in Strathfield, New South Wales in March 1958. His widow died four months later.

Select credits
Just Peggy (1918) – writer, producer, director
The Man They Could Not Hang (1934) – producer
Mystery Island (1937) – writer, director

Family
Pastrycook and confectioner Jonas Lipman (c. 1835 – 21 January 1880) and Hannah Lipman arrived in South Australia by 1857 and established a shop opposite the Port Adelaide railway station. Their family included:
Isaac "Ike" Lipman (c. 1849 – 10 May 1903) married Elizabeth Griggiths "Bessie" Seedle (c. 1855 – 7 March 1903) on 22 July 1876. He was licensee, Lion Hotel, Coolgardie from c. 1900. He was also known as a horse owner and bookmaker. Their children include:

Jonas Alfred Lipman (1875 - 18 November 1941 ) married Jeanette "Jennie" Harris (c. 1878 – 16 April 1909), eldest daughter of Barnett Harris of Coolgardie, on 11 November 1899. They had 3 daughters. Olga Verna (1 May 1901 - 3 April 1988), Stella Annie Elizabeth ( 4 February 1904 - 9 October 1984) and Glory Rose (22 December 1907 – 22 March 1908).Jeanette and Glory are buried at Karrakatta, Western Australia. 
Judah Michael Lipman (1878– )
Henry George Lipman (1880– )
Stella Rose Lipman(1882– ) soprano in Coolgardie 1900?
Verna Clare Lipman (1883– ) also singer, married Malcolm William John "Will" McConnochie on 27 April 1904, separated 1915
Judah Moss Lipman (c. 1852 – 7 July 1911) married Sylvia Selina Hyams (died 24 August 1918) on 9 March 1881, lived at "The Gums" Northgate Street, Unley Park. She died at Sylvia House, Harrow Road, St. Peters, South Australia. Judah made his considerable fortune by cleverly purchasing hotels and pubs along the vein of the gold rush. He was partner with Charles Vincent ( – 20 February 1922) in var. Coolgardie businesses inc. Grand Hotel and WA Brewing and Ice Company, also rose fancier.

Jonas Alfred "Joe" Lipman subject of this article, (1881– 1958) He married  Gertrude "Gertie" Solomon (5 June 1879 – 24 July 1958) on 19 February 1917., lived in Sydney with two children:
Judith Sylvia Lipman (29 January 1919 – February 2020 ) married Neville Terrence "Terry" O'Connor, (8 October 1918 - 28 November 2002) the son of a Monaro Region pioneering family. around 1948. She made headline news when an employer forced a kiss on her.
Victoria J O'Connor
Rochelle G O'Connor (1954 - ) married Keith Osborne Jenkins (12 October 1947 - 18 February 2013) on 1 May 1974. They had three children. She married secondly Jonathan Wiley.
T Jenkins married S Malay
Vanessa Jenkins (1982- ) married Dominic Barry
Sarah Jenkins (1986- ) married Peter Bedingfield Shutt. The wedding was featured in Vogue Australia.
Robert Alfred Lipman (3 November 1920 – ) married Mona Mary Kavanagh ( 14 November 1930- ) April 1954. They had four children.
David W Lipman married Michelle H Byrne. They had two children.
Mark R Lipman married Christine Cluff. 
John T Lipman married Dawn Walters.
Judith Ann Lipman ( 23rd July 1963-) 

Rebecca Rose "Rebe" Lipman (1885 – July 1939) never married
Sarah Leah "Sadie" Lipman (1887– ) married Roy M. Cashmore on 22 March 1911
Hyam John "Boy" Lipman (1889–1960) married Esther Solomon MBE (1900–1991) daughter of V. L. Solomon and close relative of Jonas' wife Gertrude. As Lady Esther Lipman–Jacobs she was Adelaide's first female elected councillor and served two terms as deputy Lord Mayor. In 2012 the City of Adelaide unveiled a commemorative sculpture of her in the gardens.
Dr Rex J Lipman AO ED OLH ONM (1922 – 2015) married Josephine Eve Fisher on 22 May 1947. Gertrude Lipman and her daughter Judith were wedding guests. Lipman attended St Peter’s College from 1933 to 1937. He enlisted in the army at the outbreak of the Second World War and served with distinction as a commando behind the Japanese lines in Timor, and as a staff officer in the famous 9th division where he was Mentioned in Dispatches (1945). After the War he successfully studied dental surgery and built a large practice in Adelaide.  In the 1960s, he was involved with banking and finance and was CEO of Adelaide’s most successful merchant bank. In the 1970s he set up Angas Travel and brought the Swiss Hotel Association and the Cordon Bleu of Paris to Australia. Towards the end of the 1990s, Rex’s son, Gerald, took over as CEO of the International College of Hotel Management that Rex had started in 1992. It is now one of the leading international hotel management schools in the world. Lipman wrote several books, including his autobiography, Luck's Been a Lady.  Lipman was a close friend of News Corp founder Rupert Murdoch, former deputy prime minister Tim Fischer, racing Cups King Bart Cummings, Australia's high commissioner to London Alexander Downer and former South Australian Liberal premiers John Olsen and Dean Brown, among others. His funeral was attended by over 600 mourners.
Rose Lipman (1890– ) perhaps died 1983
Violet "Vie" Lipman (1892– ) perhaps died 1975
(Leah) Daphne Lipman (1894– ) married Simon Levy on 20 November 1918; alive 1939
Alfred Emile Lipman (1 October 1897 – 1963) married Beryl Solomon-Senior (6 July 1911 – ), daughter of J. M. Solomon–Senior
Michael Lipman (c. 1853 – 3 May 1924) married Sarah Hyams (eldest daughter of H. D. Hyams) on 22 November 1882. A case of a set of brothers marrying a set of sisters.
George Lipman (c. 1858 – 6 July 1913) died at Wayville
Harry Lipman (c.1863 – 16 June 1942) of 91 Avoca Street, Randwick, married Eva Mitchell (c. 1865 – 10 February 1942) on 2 June 1880
Rose Lipman (9 May 1865 – prob died 1920s) married ship's hairdresser Jacob "Jack" Israel on 20 May 1897, divorced 1909 
Abraham/Alfred Lipman (c. 1866 – 21 May 1897) died at Coolgardie

References

External links

J.A. Lipman at National Film and Sound Archive

19th-century births
1958 deaths
Australian male stage actors
Australian theatre directors
Australian film directors
Film distributors (people)